Litophyton is a genus of soft corals in the family Nephtheidae.

Species
The World Register of Marine Species includes the following species in the genus:

Litophyton acuticonicum (Verseveldt, 1974)
Litophyton amentaceum (Studer, 1894)
Litophyton arboreum Forskål, 1775
Litophyton bayeri (Verseveldt, 1966)
Litophyton berdfordi (Shann, 1912)
Litophyton brassicum (Kükenthal, 1903)
Litophyton bumastum (Verseveldt, 1973)
Litophyton capnelliformis (Thomson & Dean, 1931)
Litophyton carnosum (Kükenthal)
Litophyton cervispiculosum (Thomson & Dean, 1931)
Litophyton chabrolii (Andouin, 1828)
Litophyton columnaris (Studer, 1895)
Litophyton compactum (Verseveldt, 1966)
Litophyton concinnum (Kükenthal, 1905)
Litophyton corallinum (Kükenthal, 1910)
Litophyton crassum (Kükenthal, 1903)
Litophyton cupressiformis (Kükenthal, 1903)
Litophyton curvum van Ofwegen, 2016
Litophyton debilis (Kükenthal, 1895)
Litophyton digitatum (Wright & Studer, 1889)
Litophyton elongatum (Kükenthal, 1895)
Litophyton erectum (Kükenthal, 1903)
Litophyton erinaceum Kükenthal
Litophyton filamentosum (Verseveldt, 1973)
Litophyton formosanum Kükenthal, 1903
Litophyton fulvum Forskål, 1775
Litophyton globulosum (May, 1899)
Litophyton gracillimum (Thomson & Dean, 1931)
Litophyton graeffei (Kükenthal, 1896)
Litophyton griseum (Kükenthal, 1895)
Litophyton juniperum (Thomson & Dean, 1931)
Litophyton laevis (Kükenthal, 1913)
Litophyton lanternarium (Verseveldt, 1973)
Litophyton legiopolypum (Verseveldt & Alderslade, 1982)
Litophyton lighti Roxas, 1933
Litophyton maldivensis (Hickson, 1905)
Litophyton mollis (Macfadyan, 1936)
Litophyton nigrum (Kükenthal, 1895)
Litophyton orientale Roxas, 1933
Litophyton pacificum (Kükenthal, 1903)
Litophyton pyramidalis (Kükenthal, 1895)
Litophyton ramosum (Quoy & Gaimard, 1833)
Litophyton rigidum Light
Litophyton rubrum (Kükenthal, 1910)
Litophyton savignyi (Ehrenberg, 1834)
Litophyton setoensis (Utinomi, 1954)
Litophyton sibogae (Thomson & Dean, 1931)
Litophyton simulatum (Verseveldt, 1970)
Litophyton sphaerophorum (Kükenthal, 1903)
Litophyton striatum (Kükenthal, 1903)
Litophyton tenuis (Kükenthal, 1896)
Litophyton thujarium (Kükenthal, 1903)
Litophyton tongaensis (Kükenthal, 1903)
Litophyton viridis (May, 1898)

References

Nephtheidae
Octocorallia genera